Stepan Fyodorovich Alexandrovsky (Russian: Степан Фёдорович Александровский; (25 December 1842, Riga - 1 February 1906, Saint Petersburg) was a Russian portrait painter and watercolorist.

Biography
He attended a classical grammar school and was originally planning for a career in medicine, but soon found himself attracted to art. In pursuit of that, he moved to saint Petersburg and began auditing classes at the Imperial Academy of Arts. One of his portraits was awarded a small silver medal in 1861.

He was a regular participant in the Academy's exhibitions and was named an "Artist" in 1864. Later he became a "First-Class Artist" (1869). He was named an "Academician" in 1874 for his portrait of War Minister, Dmitry Milyutin. By 1884, he was a "Free Artist" and honorary member of the Academy.

Among his best-known works are a series of portrait albums: thirty of Central Asian dignitaries who came to Moscow for the coronation of Alexander III (1884); forty-five of the Knights of various military orders (1886); and members of an embassy from 'Abd al-Ahad Khan, the Emir of Bukhara (1889).

He also provided illustrations for several periodicals and participated in exhibitions held by the Imperial Society for the Encouragement of the Arts.

Works

References

External links

1842 births
1906 deaths
Artists from Riga
People from Kreis Riga
19th-century painters from the Russian Empire
Russian male painters
20th-century Russian painters
Russian watercolorists
Imperial Academy of Arts alumni
Members of the Imperial Academy of Arts
Burials at Smolensky Lutheran Cemetery
19th-century male artists from the Russian Empire
20th-century Russian male artists